The Massagetae or Massageteans, also known as Sakā tigraxaudā or Orthocorybantians, were an ancient Eastern Iranian Saka people who inhabited the steppes of Central Asia and were part of the wider Scythian cultures.

The Massagetae rose to power in the 8th to 7th centuries BCE, when they kickstarted a series of events with wide-reaching consequences by expelling the Scythians out of Central Asia and into the Caucasian and Pontic Steppes. The Massagetae are most famous for their queen Tomyris's alleged defeating and killing of Cyrus, the founder of the Persian Achaemenid Empire.

The Massagetae declined after the 3rd century BCE, after which they merged with some other tribes to form the Alans, a people who belonged to the larger Sarmatian tribal confederation, and who moved westwards into the Caucasian and European steppes, where they participated in the events of the Migration Period.

Name

Massagetae
The name  is the Latin form of the Ancient Greek name .

The Iranologist Rüdiger Schmitt notes that although the original name of the Massagetae is unattested, it appears that the most plausible etymon is the Iranian .  is the plural form, containing the East Iranian suffix , which is reflected in Greek . The name literally means "concerned with fish," or "fisherman." This corresponds with the remark made by the ancient Greek historian Herodotus (1.216.3) that "they live on their livestock and fish." Schmitt states that any other interpretations on the origin of the original Iranian name of the Massagetae are "linguistically unacceptable."

According to Harmatta's hypothesis, the Bactrian name  would have corresponded to the name , meaning "men," used by the Massagetae for themselves.

This name was a reference to the Phrygian cap worn by the ancient Iranian peoples, of which the  wore an unusually tall and pointed form.

Identification

The scholar Y. A. Zadneprovskiy has instead suggested that the Dahae were descendants of the Massagetae.

Sub-tribes
The Massagetae were composed of multiple sub-tribes, including:
the 
the 
the 

Location

The Massagetae lived in the Caspian Steppe as well as in the lowlands of Central Asia located to the east of the Caspian Sea and the south-east of the Aral Sea, more precisely across the large area stretching from the lands around the Amu Darya and Zarafshan rivers up to the steppes and the deserts to the north of the Khorasan mountain corridor, that is in the region including the Kyzylkum and Karakum deserts and the Ustyurt Plateau, especially the area between the Araxes and Iaxartes rivers and around Chorasmia. The territory of the Massagetae thus included the area corresponding to modern-day Turkmenistan and might possibly have extended to parts of Hyrcania as well.

One of the Massagetaean sub-groups, the Apasiacae, lived either on the east coast of the Aral Sea between the Oxus and Tanais/Iaxartes rivers, or possibly along the Oxus in western Bactria. Another Massagetaean sub-group, the Derbices, lived in the area bordered by the Caspian Sea to the west and by Hyrcania to the south, and the Balkhan Mountain and the Ochus river and its estuary were in their territory.

The imprecise description of where the Massagetae lived by ancient authors has however led modern scholars to ascribe to them various locations, such as the Oxus delta, the Iaxartes delta, between the Caspian and Aral seas or further to the north or north-east, but without basing these suggestions on any conclusive arguments.

History

Early history
The Massagetae rose to power in the 8th to 7th centuries BCE, when they migrated from the east into Central Asia, from where they expelled the Scythians, another nomadic Iranian tribe to whom they were closely related. After this, they came to occupy large areas of the region, including the Caspian Steppe where they supplanted the Scythians. The Massagetae displacing the early Scythians and forcing them to the west across the Araxes river and into the Caucasian and Pontic steppes started a significant movement of the nomadic peoples of the Eurasian Steppe, following which the Scythians displaced the Cimmerians and the Agathyrsi, who were also nomadic Iranian peoples closely related to the Massagetae and the Scythians, conquered their territories, and invaded Western Asia. There, their presence had an important role in the history of the ancient civilisations of Mesopotamia, Anatolia, Egypt, and Iran.

The  had close contact with the Median Empire, whose influence had stretched to the lands east of the Caspian Sea, before it was replaced by the Persian Achaemenid dynasty in 550 BC. It has also been speculated that the Orthocorybantians may have lived in Eastern Armenia, which bordered the Median Empire. However, this interpretation clearly conflicts with Herodotus' information on Achaemenid military rosters.

Death of Cyrus 

During the 6th century BCE, the Massagetae had to face the successor of the Median Empire, the newly formed Persian Achaemenid Empire, whose founder, Cyrus II, carried out a campaign against them in 530 BCE. According to Herodotus, Cyrus captured a Massagetaean camp by ruse, after which the Massagetae queen Tomyris led the tribe's main force against the Persians, defeated them, killed Cyrus, and placed his severed head in a sack full of blood. The reason why the Derbices, and not the Massagetae, are named as the people against whom Cyrus died fighting is because the Derbices were members or identical with the Massagetae. According to Strabo, Cyrus died fighting against the Saka (of which the Massagetae were a group), and according to Quintus Curtius Rufus he died fighting against the Abiae.

The Babylonian scribe Berossus, who lived in 3rd century BCE, instead recorded that Cyrus died in a battle against the Dahae; according to the Iranologist Muhammad Dandamayev, Berossus identified the Dahae rather than the Massagetae as Cyrus's killers because they had replaced the Massagetae as the most famous nomadic tribe of Central Asia long before Berossus's time; although some scholars identified the Dahae as being identical with the Massagetae or as one of their sub-groups.

Achaemenid rule

Little more is known about the Massagetae after the war with Cyrus. By around 520 BCE and possibly earlier, they were ruled by a king named Skuⁿxa, who rebelled against the Persian Empire until one of the successors of Cyrus, the Achaemenid king Darius I, carried out a campaign against the Sakas from 520 to 518 BCE during which he conquered the Massagetae/, captured Skuⁿxa, and replaced him with a ruler who was loyal to Achaemenid power. According to Polyaenus, Darius fought against three armies led by three kings, respectively named Sacesphares, Thamyris (whose name might be related to that of Tomyris), and Amorges or Homarges, with Polyaenus's account being based on Persian historical records.

The territories of the Saka were absorbed into the Achaemenid Empire as part of Chorasmia, which included much of the territory between the Oxus and the Iaxartes rivers, and the Saka supplied the Achaemenid army with a large number of mounted bowmen.

Later history
The Massagetae, along with the Sogdians and Bactrians, participated in the rebellion of Spitamenes against Alexander III of Macedon, but they later submitted to him again after Spitamenes was murdered.

Among the scholars who do not identify the Massagetae with the Dahae, Rüdiger Schmitt suggests that the Massagetae were instead absorbed by the Dahae by the later Hellenistic period. Muhammad Dandamayev has suggested that the Dahae had replaced the Massagetae as the most known people of the Central Asian steppes. Marek Jan Olbrycht suggests that the Dahae migrated to the west from the areas east of the Aral Sea and around the Iaxartes valley and expelled the Derbices from their homeland, after which the latter split, with a part of them migrating into Hyrcania and others to the lower Uzboy river.

Around 230 BCE, the Parnian king and founder of the Parthian Empire, Arsaces I, sought refuge from the Seleucid king Seleucus II Callinicus by fleeing among the Massagataean sub-tribe of the Apasiacae. Seleucus's attempted campaign to recover the eastern satrapies of his empire was initially successful. However, the outbreak of revolts in the western part of his empire prevented him from continuing his war against the Parthians, who, with the backing of the Apasiacae, were ultimately successful.

Disappearance

The dominance of the Massagetae in Central Asia ended in the 3rd century BCE, following the Macedonian conquest of Persia, which cut off the relations between the steppe nomads and the sedentary populations of the previous Persian Achaemenid Empire. The succeeding Seleucid Empire started attacking the Massagetae, Saka and Dahae nomads who had lived to the north of its borders, which in turn led to these peoples putting westward pressure from the east on a related nomadic Iranian people, the Sarmatians. The Sarmatians, taking advantage of the decline of Scythian power in the west, crossed the Don river and invaded Scythia starting in the late 4th century and the early 3rd century BCE.

The Massagetae themselves merged with tribal groups in Central Asia to form the Alans, a people who themselves belonged to the larger Sarmatian group. Related to the Asii who had invaded Bactria in the 2nd century BCE, the Alans were pushed by the Kang-chü people to the west into the Caucasian and Pontic steppes, where they came in contact and conflict with the Parthian and Roman empires. By the 2nd century CE, they had conquered the steppes of the north Caucasus and the north Black Sea area and created a powerful confederation of tribes under their rule.

In 375 CE, the Huns conquered most of the Alans living to the east of the Don river, massacred a significant number of them and absorbed them into their tribal polity, while the Alans to the west of the Don remained free from Hunnish domination and participated in the movements of the Migration Period. Some free Alans fled into the mountains of the Caucasus, where they participated in the ethnogenesis of populations including the Ossetians and the Kabardians, and other Alan groupings survived in Crimea. Other free Alans migrated into Central and then Western Europe, from where some of them went to Britannia and Hispania, and some Alans joined the Germanic Vandals into crossing the Strait of Gibraltar and creating the Vandal Kingdom in North Africa.

Legacy
Byzantine authors later used the name "Massagetae" as an archaising term for the Huns, Turks, Tatars and other related peoples who were completely unrelated to the populations the name initially designated in Antiquity.

A 9th century work by Rabanus Maurus, De Universo, states: "The Massagetae are in origin from the tribe of the Scythians, and are called Massagetae, as if heavy, that is, strong Getae." In Central Asian languages such as Middle Persian and Avestan, the prefix massa means "great," "heavy," or "strong."

Some authors, such as Alexander Cunningham, James P. Mallory, Victor H. Mair, and Edgar Knobloch have proposed relating the Massagetae to the Gutians of 2000 BC Mesopotamia, and/or a people known in ancient China as the "Da Yuezhi" or "Great Yuezhi" (who founded the Kushan Empire in South Asia). Mallory and Mair suggest that Da Yuezhi  may at one time have been pronounced d'ad-ngiwat-tieg, connecting them to the Massagetae. These theories are not widely accepted, however.

Many scholars have suggested that the Massagetae were related to the Getae of ancient Eastern Europe.

Tadeusz Sulimirski notes that the Sacae also invaded parts of Northern India. Weer Rajendra Rishi, an Indian linguist has identified linguistic affinities between Indian and Central Asian languages, which further lends credence to the possibility of historical Sacae influence in Northern India.

Culture

Lifestyle
According to Strabo, the Massagetae lived on the plains, the mountains, the marshes, and the islands in the country irrigated by the Araxes river.

Some Massagetae were primarily fishermen, and other groups of the tribe bred sheep for their milk and wool, but also harvested root vegetables and wild fruits. None of the Massagetae, however, practised any form of agriculture, and their food consisted of meat and fish, and they primarily drank milk, but not wine.

Gold and bronze were plentiful where the Massagetae lived, but they did not use any iron or silver because these were not available in their country.

Clothing

Like all ancient Iranian peoples, the Massagetae/ wore knee-length tunics which were either straight and closed (following Median fashion) or open with lapels, both styles being fastened by a belt at the waist (following typically Scythic fashion). Underneath, they wore narrow trousers and moccasins. Over these, they sometimes wore a cloak with long and narrow sleeves, and the pointed cap, although their tribe wore a distinctive form of this headdress which had a sharp point, and from which the names given to them by the Persians and the Greeks, both meaning "wearer of pointed caps," were derived.

The fishermen wore seal skins, while the sheep-breeders wore clothing made of wool.

The Massagetae wore golden headdresses, belts, shoulder straps, and used golden harnesses and bronze armour for their horses.

Warfare
The Massagetae fought both on foot and on horseback, and their weapons consisted of bows and arrows, spears, and battle-axes, and their horse armour, spearheads, and arrowheads were golden.

Language
The name of the Massagetaean prince, recorded in the Greek form  and reflecting the Scythian form , is of Scythian language origin, and his name and the name of the Agathyrsi king Spargapeithes and the Scythian king Spargapeithes are variants of the same name, and are cognates with the Avestan name .

Religion

Herodotus mentioned that the Massagetae worshipped only the sun god, to whom they sacrificed horses. This is seen to indicate the cult of the Iranian sun god Mithra, who was associated with the worship of fire and horses. When Cyrus attacked the Massagetae, their queen Tomyris swore by the Sun to kill him if he did not return back to his kingdom.

However, Strabo recorded that the Derbices, who were either identical with the Massagetae or one of their sub-tribes, worshipped "Mother Earth," interpreted as the Earth and Water goddess Api.

Marriage customs
The Massagetae contracted monogamous marriages, although the wives could have sexual relations with other men. When a Massagetaean man wanted to have sexual relations with a woman, he would hang his gorytos outside of her tent, inside of which the couple would proceed to have intercourse. Edvard Westermarck, however, in The History of Human Marriage, suggested that Herodotus and Strabo, on whose writings this understanding of Massagetaean marriage customs is based, might have been mistaken, and that the relevant custom was instead one, said to be common in Central Asia, by which brothers shared a single wife.

Funeral customs
According to Herodotus, members of the Massagetae were sacrificed and cooked and eaten with the meat of sacrificial animals. Members of the Massagetae who died of illness were buried or left as food for wild animals.

See also 
 Zarinaea, queen of a Saka tribe which also had contact with the Medes
 Mount Imeon
 Indo-Scythians
 Getae
 Thyssagetae

Footnotes 
<references>
 </ref>
 </ref>
 </ref>
 </ref>
</references>

Sources 

 
 

 
 
 
 
 
 
 

 

 
 
 

 

Massagetae
Nomadic groups in Eurasia
Tribes described primarily by Herodotus